Ischnochiton circumvallatus is a common medium-sized species of chiton in the family Ischnochitonidae, endemic to the southern South Island and the Subantarctic Islands of New Zealand where it habits exposed rocky shores down to the low intertidal zone. Coloured light buff to light green on both surfaces, occasionally with reddish brown. Moderately raised shell and narrow girdle which has small scales. Broods larvae along the sides of the body.

References

 Powell A. W. B., New Zealand Mollusca, William Collins Publishers Ltd, Auckland, New Zealand 1979 

Ischnochitonidae
Chitons of New Zealand
Chitons described in 1847